Mainroth station is a railway station in the Mainroth district of the town of Burgkunstadt, located in the Lichtenfels district in Upper Franconia, Germany.

References

Railway stations in Bavaria
Buildings and structures in Lichtenfels (district)